The 1931 Philadelphia Athletics season involved the A's finishing first in the American League with a record of 107 wins and 45 losses. It was the team's third consecutive pennant-winning season and its third consecutive season with over 100 wins. However the A's lost the 1931 World Series to the St. Louis Cardinals in seven games. The series loss prevented the Athletics from becoming the first major league baseball team to win three consecutive World Series; the New York Yankees would accomplish the feat seven years later. The Athletics, ironically, would go on to earn their own threepeat in 1974, some forty-three years after the failed 1931 attempt.

1931 was also the A's final World Series appearance in Philadelphia. Their next AL pennant would be in 1972, after they had moved to Oakland.

Offseason
 November 29, 1930: Homer Summa and Ossie Orwoll were traded by the Athletics to the Portland Beavers for Herb Lahti (minors).
 December 10, 1930: Cy Perkins was purchased from the Athletics by the New York Yankees.

Regular season
1931 was the greatest season of Lefty Grove's career. He went 31–4, with a 2.06 ERA and 175 strikeouts, easily winning the pitching triple crown. He was voted league Most Valuable Player. Combined with the efforts of 21- and 20-game winners George Earnshaw and Rube Walberg, Philadelphia allowed the fewest runs of any AL team.

Slugger Al Simmons won the batting title with a .390 average and came in third in MVP voting.

Season standings

Record vs. opponents

Roster

Player stats

Batting

Starters by position
Note: Pos = Position; G = Games played; AB = At bats; H = Hits; Avg. = Batting average; HR = Home runs; RBI = Runs batted in

Other batters
Note: G = Games played; AB = At bats; H = Hits; Avg. = Batting average; HR = Home runs; RBI = Runs batted in

Pitching

Starting pitchers
Note: G = Games pitched; IP = Innings pitched; W = Wins; L = Losses; ERA = Earned run average; SO = Strikeouts

Other pitchers
Note: G = Games pitched; IP = Innings pitched; W = Wins; L = Losses; ERA = Earned run average; SO = Strikeouts

Relief pitchers
Note: G = Games pitched; W = Wins; L = Losses; SV = Saves; ERA = Earned run average; SO = Strikeouts

Awards and honors

League top five finishers 
Mickey Cochrane
 #4 in AL in batting average (.349)

George Earnshaw
 #2 in AL in strikeouts (152)
 #3 in AL in wins (21)

Jimmie Foxx
 #4 in AL in home runs (30)

Lefty Grove
 AL leader in wins (31)
 AL leader in ERA (2.06) (Grove's 2.06 ERA was 2.32 runs below the league average.)
 AL leader in strikeouts (175)

Al Simmons
 AL leader in batting average (.390)
 #3 in AL in slugging percentage (.641)
 #4 in AL in RBI (128)
 #4 in AL in on-base percentage (.444)

1931 World Series 

NL St. Louis Cardinals (4) vs. AL Philadelphia Athletics (3)

Farm system

LEAGUE CHAMPIONS: Harrisburg

Notes

References
1931 Philadelphia Athletics team page at Baseball Reference
1931 Philadelphia Athletics team page at www.baseball-almanac.com

Oakland Athletics seasons
Philadelphia Athletics season
American League champion seasons
Oakland